Gurzuf or Hurzuf is a resort-town (urban-type settlement) in Yalta Municipality of the Autonomous Republic of Crimea, a territory recognized by a majority of countries as part of Ukraine and incorporated by Russia as the Republic of Crimea. Population: 

It is located on the northern coast of the Black Sea. It is the site of a 6th-century fortress built by Justinian I and called by Procopius the fortress of the Gorzoubitai. The fortress was later restored by the Genoese who called the place Garzuni, Grasni, and Gorzanium, and appointed it the seat of a chief magistrate.  It was a former Crimean Tatar village, now a part of Greater Yalta. Alexander Pushkin visited Gurzuf in 1821 and ballet master Marius Petipa died here. The International Children Center Artek (former All-Union Young Pioneer camp Artek) is situated just behind the mount of Ayu-Dag (Bear Mountain). The World Organization of the Scout Movement's Eurasian Region is headquartered in the town.

Between Gurzuf and Mount Ayu-Dag is Cape Suuksu. At the top of the Cape is a tower, a medieval cemetery, and a small monument to Pushkin.

People from Gurzuf 
 Cengiz Dağcı (1919–2011), Crimean Tatar novelist and poet
 Mansur Mazinov (1906–1983), Soviet air force officer, the first Crimean Tatar pilot
 Natalia Popovych (born 1968), Ukrainian politician

Gallery

References

External links
 
 

 
Urban-type settlements in Crimea
Populated coastal places in Ukraine
Seaside resorts in Ukraine
Populated coastal places in Russia
Seaside resorts in Russia
Simferopolsky Uyezd
Yalta Municipality